is a train station in Sangō, Ikoma District, Nara Prefecture, Japan.

Lines 
Kintetsu
Ikoma Line

Adjacent stations 

Railway stations in Nara Prefecture
Railway stations in Japan opened in 1951